Metarctia phaeoptera is a moth of the subfamily Arctiinae. It was described by George Hampson in 1909. It is found in the Democratic Republic of the Congo, Kenya, Tanzania and Uganda.

References

 

Metarctia
Moths described in 1909